Hugo M. Rietveld (7 March 1932 – 16 July 2016) was a Dutch crystallographer who is famous for his publication on the full profile refinement method in powder diffraction, which became later known as the Rietveld refinement method. The method is used for the characterisation of crystalline materials from X-ray powder diffraction data. The Rietveld refinement uses a least squares approach to refine a theoretical line profile (calculated from a known or postulated crystal structure) until it matches the measured profile. The introduction of this technique which used the full profile instead of individual reflections was a significant step forward in the diffraction analysis of powder samples.

Biography
Rietveld was born in the Hague. After completing Grammar School in the Netherlands he moved to Australia and studied physics at the University of Western Australia in Perth. In 1964 he obtained his PhD degree under Edward Norman Maslen with a thesis entitled "The Structure of p-Diphenylbenzene and Other Compounds", a single crystal neutron and X-ray diffraction study. Dorothy Hodgkin was an external examiner on his thesis. This investigation was the first single crystal neutron diffraction study in Australia and was conducted at the High Flux Australian Reactor (HIFAR) in the Lucas Heights suburb of Sydney.

In 1964 he became a research officer at the Energy Research Centre of the Netherlands (Energieonderzoek Centrum Nederland, ECN) in Petten, where he worked together with Bert Loopstra and Bob van Laar on the structure solution and refinement of uranates and other ceramic compounds using neutron powder diffraction. In 1967 he implemented the full profile refinement method in a computer program, which he published in his 1969 citation classic. This innovation, however, was only slowly adopted by the community, and so Rietveld in 1974 chose to become head of the library department at Petten. He stayed at ECN until he retired in 1992.

Awards
 The Royal Swedish Academy of Sciences awarded Hugo M. Rietveld, the Aminoff prize in Stockholm, 31 March 1995.
 Barrett Award on behalf of the Denver X-ray Conference Organizing Committee in Denver, U.S., 6 August 2003.
 The Royal Award of Officer in the Order of Oranje-Nassau, for his outstanding contribution to the field of chemistry. Alkmaar, Netherlands, 28 October 2004.
 Award for Distinguished Powder Diffractionists, awarded by The European Diffraction Conferences, handed out on 30 August 2010 in Darmstadt.
 Hans-Kühl-Medal 2010, awarded by Gesellschaft Deutscher Chemiker (GDCh), Fachgruppe Bauchemie, handed out on 7 October 2010 in Dortmund.

Further reading
 Young, R. A. (Ed.). (1993). The Rietveld method (Vol. 6). Oxford. Oxford University Press.

External links
Personal page

References

1932 births
2016 deaths
Crystallographers
Dutch expatriates in Australia
20th-century Dutch physicists
Scientists from The Hague
University of Western Australia alumni